Deborah F. G. Fraser is a New Zealand teaching academic. She is currently a full professor at the University of Waikato.

Academic career
After an honours teaching degree from Massey University, Fraser had a career as a primary school teacher, both in New Zealand and overseas, before doing a PhD at the University of Waikato, where she stayed on as a lecturer, eventually rising to become full professor in 2015.

Selected works
 Fraser, Deborah FG. "Strangers in their own land: friendship issues when children have cancer." Journal of Research in Special Educational Needs 3, no. 3 (2003): 147–153.
 Fraser, Deborah FG. "From the playful to the profound: What metaphors tell us about gifted children." Roeper Review 25, no. 4 (2003): 180–184.
 Fraser, Deborah. "Sin, Hope and Optimism in Children's Metaphors." (2000).

References

External links
 researchgate
 institutional homepage

New Zealand women academics
Massey University alumni
University of Waikato alumni
Academic staff of the University of Waikato
Living people
Year of birth missing (living people)
New Zealand women writers